The Cathedral of Santa María (Ciudad Rodrigo) (Spanish: Catedral de Santa María (Ciudad Rodrigo)) is a cathedral located in Ciudad Rodrigo, province of Salamanca, Castile and León, Spain. It was declared Bien de Interés Cultural in 1889.

The Renaissance composers Juan Navarro Hispalensis and his pupil Juan Esquivel Barahona were both choirmasters at the cathedral.

References

See also 
 List of Bien de Interés Cultural in the Province of Salamanca

Bien de Interés Cultural landmarks in the Province of Salamanca
Ciudad Rodrigo